The Olympus Zuiko Digital ED 18-180mm 1:3.5-6.3 is an interchangeable superzoom lens announced by Olympus Corporation on September 26, 2005.

References

External links
 

Camera lenses introduced in 2005
018-180mm f 3.5-6.3 ED
Superzoom lenses